The geometric set cover problem is the special case of the set cover problem in geometric settings.

However, in higher dimensions, they are known to be NP-complete even for simple shapes, i.e., when  is induced by unit disks or unit squares. The discrete unit disc cover problem is a geometric version of the general set cover problem which is NP-hard.

Many approximation algorithms have been devised for these problems. Due to the geometric nature, the approximation ratios for these problems can be much better than the general set cover/hitting set problems. Moreover, these approximate solutions can even be computed in near-linear time.

Approximation algorithms

The greedy algorithm for the general set cover problem gives  approximation, where . This approximation is known to be tight up to constant factor. However, in geometric settings, better approximations can be obtained. Using a multiplicative weight algorithm, Brönnimann and Goodrich showed that an -approximate set cover/hitting set for a range space  with constant VC-dimension can be computed in polynomial time, where  denotes the size of the optimal solution.

Near-linear-time algorithms

Based on the iterative-reweighting technique of Clarkson and Brönnimann and Goodrich, Agarwal and Pan gave algorithms that computes an approximate set cover/hitting set of a geometric range space in  time. For example, their algorithms computes an -approximate hitting set in  time for range spaces induced by 2D axis-parallel rectangles; and it computes an -approximate set cover in  time for range spaces induced by 2D disks.

See also
 Set cover problem
 Vertex cover
 Lebesgue covering dimension
 Carathéodory's extension theorem

References

Geometry